Júlio de Lemos de Castro Caldas (19 November 1943 – 4 January 2020) was a Portuguese lawyer and politician.

Legal career
Castro Caldas was born on 19 November 1943, and raised in Arcos de Valdevez. He led the Portuguese Bar Association as president from 1993 to 1999, serving two terms.

Political career
Castro Caldas was elected to the Assembly of the Republic from Viana do Castelo District in 1980 and served until 1983, as a member of the Social Democratic Party. He then served as Minister of National Defence between 1999 and 2001. Castro Caldas stepped down from the position in 2012. He died on 4 January 2020, aged 76, after seeking medical treatment for a stroke at the CUF Infante Santo Hospital in Lisbon.

References

1943 births
2020 deaths
People from Arcos de Valdevez
Social Democratic Party (Portugal) politicians
Members of the Assembly of the Republic (Portugal)
20th-century Portuguese politicians
21st-century Portuguese politicians
20th-century Portuguese lawyers
21st-century Portuguese lawyers
Ministers of National Defence of Portugal